The capital of Andhra Pradesh have been changed three times since its formation. However in December 2019 the chief minister of AP Jagan Mohan Reddy stated in the AP assembly that the govt has a plan to establish 3 exclusive capitals for three branches,namely executive,judiciary and legislature

List

Overview 

On 1 October 1953, Andhra State was formed with its capital as Kurnool. It was formed after the Andhra movement, led by various Telugu leaders. During the same time, campaigns such as Visalandhra movement started in Andhra State and by Telugu-speaking people in Hyderabad State. States Reorganisation Act, 1956 came into effect from 1 November 1956 with an aim to organising the boundaries of India's states and territories along linguistic lines. As a result, the central government, led by Nehru, merged Andhra State and Hyderabad State (Telugu-speaking areas are now Telangana) to form united Andhra Pradesh on 1 November 1956 after ensuring safeguards to Telangana in the form of a gentleman's agreement. Hyderabad became the new capital of the state of united Andhra Pradesh.

There have been several movements to revoke the merger of Telangana and Andhra, major ones occurring in 1969, 1972, and 2009. The movement for a new state of Telangana gained momentum in the 21st century by an initiative of Telangana Political Joint Action Committee, TJAC including political leadership representing the Telangana area. On 9 December 2009 the government of India announced the process of formation of the Telangana state. Violent protests led by people in the Coastal Andhra and Rayalseema regions occurred immediately after the announcement, and the decision was put on hold on 23 December 2009.

The movement continued in Hyderabad and other districts of Telangana. There have been hundreds of claimed suicides, strikes, protests and disturbances to public life demanding separate statehood.

On 30 July 2013, the Congress Working Committee unanimously passed a resolution to recommend the formation of a separate Telangana state. After various stages the bill was placed in the Parliament of India in February 2014. In February 2014, Andhra Pradesh Reorganisation Act, 2014 bill was passed by the Parliament of India for the formation of Telangana state comprising ten districts from north-western Andhra Pradesh. The bill received the assent of the president and published in the Gazette on 1 March 2014. The state of Telangana was officially formed on 2 June 2014 with its capital as Hyderabad.

Amaravati was founded by former Andhra Pradesh Chief Minister N. Chandrababu Naidu in 2014 as the Greenfield administrative capital city of the Andhra Pradesh state, and its foundation stone was laid at Uddandarayunipalem by the Prime Minister of India, Narendra Modi on 22 October 2015. In 2017, Andhra Pradesh Government began operating officially from the newly planned capital city Amaravati. In August 2020, Andhra Pradesh Legislative Assembly passed Andhra Pradesh Decentralisation and Inclusive Development of All Regions Act, 2020. According to its provisions, Visakhapatnam is the executive capital while Amaravati and Kurnool serve as legislative and judicial capitals, respectively. The decision resulted in widespread protests by the farmers of Amaravati. The act has been challenged in Andhra Pradesh High Court, which ordered to maintain status quo until the court completes its hearing. On 22 November 2021, the government, led by Y. S. Jagan Mohan Reddy, have withdrawn the act. The decision to withdraw the act was taken at an emergency cabinet meeting held on 21 November 2021. Subsequently In 2022 the govt of AP has filed a special leave petition in Supreme court on high court's 3 capitals verdict . On 4th Nov 2022 the Greater Visakhapatnam municipal corporation has passed a resolution in favour of executive capital being shifted to Visakhapatnam

Gallery

References 

Andhra Pradesh-related lists
History of Andhra Pradesh